The Pungwe flat lizard (Platysaurus pungweensis) is a species of lizard in the Cordylidae family.

Description
Females and juveniles of the Pungwe flat lizard are black and striped on their backs. Males vary by subspecies. The species resembles the common flat lizard, Platysaurus intermedius.

Geography
Pungwe flat lizards live in eastern Zimbabwe and adjacent Mozambique. The type was obtained at the Pungwe River at 730 m (2,400 ft) above sea level, near the eastern border of Rhodesia (current Zimbabwe).

Habitat and ecology
Pungwe flat lizards inhabit low rock outcrops and large hills in mesic savanna. They eat ants and beetles.

Subspecies
Two subspecies are accepted:
 P. p. pungweensis – Eastern Highlands of Zimbabwe and adjacent Mozambique
 P. p. blakei Broadley, 1964 – outcrops and inselbergs in the lowlands of southern Manica Platform, central Mozambique.

References

External links
More Information

Platysaurus
Lizards of Africa
Reptiles of Mozambique
Reptiles of Zimbabwe
Reptiles described in 1959
Taxa named by Donald George Broadley